The chief of the Secret Intelligence Service serves as the head of the Secret Intelligence Service (SIS, also commonly known as MI6), which is part of the United Kingdom intelligence community. The chief is appointed by the foreign secretary, to whom they report directly. Annual reports are also made to the prime minister.

The chief of the Secret Intelligence Service typically signs letters with a "C" in green ink. This originates from the initial used by Captain Sir Mansfield Smith-Cumming, when he signed a letter "C" in green ink. Since then the chief has been known as "C".

History
From 1782 until 1909, British intelligence at the government level was handled directly by the Foreign Office, with the Army and Navy also maintaining their own intelligence branches. By 1909, growing tensions with Germany led the Committee of Imperial Defence to recommend the creation of the Secret Service Bureau to provide organization and leadership to the intelligence-gathering process as well as a layer of insulation from espionage activities for the Foreign Office. A 10 August 1909 letter from the Director of Naval Intelligence, Alexander Bethell, to then-Commander Mansfield Smith-Cumming offered him a "new billet": the opportunity to head the Foreign Section of the new Secret Service Bureau. Cumming was to begin in this role on 1 October 1909, but bureaucratic and funding obstacles delayed the start of his work. His first full day in this capacity was not until 7 October, and even then, he "went to the office and remained all day, but saw no one, nor was there anything to do there."

Cumming's tenure as chief established many of the traditions and trappings of the office. Among the best known of these, he signed documents with the initial "C" in green ink, a custom upheld throughout the history of the service. One tradition that was not maintained was the selection of the Chief from the ranks of the Royal Navy. Although Cumming and his successor Hugh Sinclair both had long Navy careers, in 1939 Army veteran Stewart Menzies was appointed over naval officer (and Churchill's preferred candidate) Gerard Muirhead-Gould. Plans to rotate the selection of Chief among the various branches of military service were considered, but most subsequent Chiefs have been career intelligence officers.

Although the existence of the Secret Intelligence Service, much less its Chief, was not officially acknowledged until 1992, the role's reality was an open secret for many years. In 1932, Compton MacKenzie was fined under the Official Secrets Act for elements of his book Greek Memories.  Among these offences, according to Attorney General Sir Thomas Inskip was "reveal[ing] the mysterious consonant by which the Chief of the Secret Service is known." By 30 May 1968, however, The Times was willing to name Menzies as the "former Head of the Secret Intelligence Service" in his obituary. A 1989 House of Commons debate listed a number of publications in which information about the Chief and his organization had been revealed.

The 1994 Intelligence Services Act established a statutory basis for the Secret Intelligence Service and the position of Chief. Since then, the office has had more public visibility, including a speech by John Sawers in 2010, described by The Times as "the first of its kind". The Chief remains the only member of the Secret Intelligence Service whose identity is officially made public.

A 2010 report revealed the Chief of the Secret Intelligence Service was receiving a salary of £169,999 at that time.

List of chiefs
Chiefs have been:

See also
Director General of MI5
Director of the Government Communications Headquarters

References